Rige is a neighbourhood in the city of Kristiansand in Agder county, Norway. It is located in the borough of Grim and in the district of Hellemyr.  Rige lies on the south side of the European route E39 highway, just south of Hellemyrtoppen and north of Øvre Slettheia.  The area is mostly an industrial/commercial area.

Transportation

References

Geography of Kristiansand
Neighbourhoods of Kristiansand